Michel Laplénie (born 1943) is a French tenor, and conductor of the baroque choral  (founded 1986) and other ensembles. He was one of the founding members of both Ensemble Clément Janequin and Les Arts Florissants.

References

External links 
 Miche Laplénie on France Musique
 Michel Laplénie, directeur musical de l'Ensemble Sagittarius on France Musique

1943 births
Living people
People from Brive-la-Gaillarde
French male conductors (music)
French operatic tenors
21st-century French conductors (music)
21st-century French male musicians